František Ptáček (born April 4, 1975) is a former Czech professional ice hockey player who lastly played with HC Sparta Praha in the Czech Extraliga.

Ptacek previously played for HC Sparta Praha and HC Karlovy Vary.

References

External links

1975 births
Czech ice hockey defencemen
Motor České Budějovice players
HC Karlovy Vary players
HC Sparta Praha players
Living people
HC Kometa Brno players
Rytíři Kladno players
Stadion Hradec Králové players
Ice hockey people from Prague
Czechoslovak ice hockey defencemen